Yunis Najafov (31 August 1967, Kalbajar District, Azerbaijan – 24 August 1992, Kalbajar District, Azerbaijan) was the National Hero of Azerbaijan, and warrior of the First Nagorno-Karabakh War.

Early life and education 
Yunis Najafov was born in Kalbajar District on 31 August 1967. In 1975 he went to secondary school in Khanlar District. In 1985 he graduated from school in Goranboy District. Yunis entered the Baku Higher Military School of Commanders and continued his education in the Chelyabninsk Tank School. In 1989, he began his military service as a lieutenant. In 1990 he was removed from the army in connection with the speeches about the events of January 20. After this incident, he went to the front-line as a volunteer to participate in the First Nagorno-Karabakh War.

Personal life 
He was single.

First Nagorno-Karabakh War 
In 1991, Yunis voluntarily went to the Karabakh front and was appointed commander of one of the units. He went through a valiant battle journey in a number of cities and districts. Yunis especially distinguished himself in the defense of villages Karkicahan, Malibeyli and the town of Shusha. Then he was sent to Baku to train soldiers for war. But as soon as Lachin and Shusha were attacked by Armenians, he returned to the front-line again. The senior lieutenant Yunis Najafov died on August 24, 1992, during the battles for the liberation of the village of Wang.

Honors 
By Decree of the President of Azerbaijan No. 350 dated December 7, 1992 senior lieutenant Yunis Najafov was posthumously awarded the title of "National Hero of Azerbaijan".

See also 
 First Nagorno-Karabakh War
 National Hero of Azerbaijan

References

Sources 
Vugar Asgarov. Azərbaycanın Milli Qəhrəmanları (Yenidən işlənmiş II nəşr). Bakı: "Dərələyəz-M", 2010, səh. 225.

1967 births
1992 deaths
Azerbaijani military personnel
Azerbaijani military personnel of the Nagorno-Karabakh War
Azerbaijani military personnel killed in action
National Heroes of Azerbaijan
People from Kalbajar District